Tingchow may refer to: 
 Tingzhou fu, the old name of Changting prefecture in Fujian province, China ("Tingchow" in Wade-Giles romanization)
 Tingzhou, a modern town in Changting County
 The Roman Catholic Diocese of Tingzhou, which was created before the name change and is coextensive with the prefecture
 Dingzhou, Hubei ("Tingchow" in Chinese postal romanization)